Microctenopoma ocellifer is a fish in the family Anabantidae found in the Congo River basin of Africa.  It grows to 5.4 cm in total length.

References

ocellifer
Fish described in 1902